Henman is an English surname. It is either an occupational surname for a fowl-keeper, the first component in this case being hen, or a nickname for a noble, courteous man, the first part then from Middle English hende.

Notable people
Notable people with the surname include:
 Héctor Henman (1879–1969), Argentine footballer
 Philip Henman (1899–1986), British businessman
 Tim Henman (born 1974), retired British tennis player

See also
 Hennemann
 Henneman
 Hensman

References

English-language surnames